The W.A. Parish Generating Station is a 3.65-gigawatt (3,653 MW), dual-fired power plant located near Thompsons, Texas. The station occupies a 4,664-acre site near Smithers Lake southwest of Houston in Fort Bend County and consists of two four-unit plants; one natural gas and the other coal (2,697 MW). With a total installed capacity of 3,653 MW, it is the second largest conventional power station in the US, and supplies about fifteen percent of the energy in the Houston area. NRG Energy owns and operates the plant.

The Powder River Basin supplies three 115-car trainloads worth of low-sulfur coal to units 5-8 or 36,000 tons daily.

Completed in January 2017, the post-combustion Petra Nova Carbon Capture Project became largest installed on an existing power plant in the world.  The system pumped 1.6 million tons of filtered carbon dioxide from unit 8 to the West Ranch Oil Field 82 miles away in Jackson County. Overall as the system was powered by natural gas it was expected to have a net effect of not releasing 785,000 tons of carbon annually. The system cost approximately $1 billion, but was idled in 2020 due to the low price of oil during the COVID-19 pandemic.

Adjacent to Parish Station is the natural gas Brazos Valley Power Plant owned by Calpine Energy which opened in 2003.

Notable Incidents 
During the 2021 Texas power crisis, Parish Station was reported to have experienced up to a 664 MW loss in generation capacity, including an 80 MW decrease in capacity early in the crisis that contributed to the need for rolling blackouts.

The Unit 8 turbine, which has a generating capacity of 610 MW, caught fire the night of May 8th, 2022. While there were no injuries reported, this turbine was heavily damaged and remained offline as of August 2022, with generating capacity expected to be restored by May 2023.

See also
 List of largest power stations in the United States
 List of power stations in Texas

References

External links

Coal-fired power stations in Texas
Buildings and structures in Fort Bend County, Texas
Natural gas-fired power stations in Texas
NRG Energy